The Right Hon. Richard Barré Dunning, 2nd Baron Ashburton (20 September 1782 – 15 February 1823), was a British peer and politician.

Life
Dunning's parents were John Dunning, 1st Baron Ashburton, and Elizabeth Baring.

Dunning succeeded to the title on 18 August 1783 as a one-year-old, and later took his seat in the House of Lords. The barony became extinct on his death at the age of 40 at Friar's Hall. The book Genealogical Memoirs of the French Royal House was written by him.

He died at Fryars Hall near Melrose on 15 February 1823 and is buried against the north wall of the north churchyard extension in St Cuthberts Churchyard in Edinburgh.

Family

On 17 September 1805, he married Anne Selby Cunninghame at Lainshaw. They had no issue.

References

Sources
 http://hansard.millbanksystems.com/people/mr-richard-dunning

1782 births
1823 deaths
Place of birth missing
Richard